The Linux Foundation Linux Certification (LFLC) is a  certification program for system administrators and engineers working with the Linux operating system, announced by the Linux Foundation in August 2014.

Linux Foundation Certifications are valid for 2 years. Candidates have the option to retake and pass the same exam to keep their Certification valid. The Certification will become valid for 2 years starting on the date the exam is retaken and passed.

Candidates may also keep Certification valid by completing one of the renewal requirement options below. Renewal requirements must be completed prior to the expiration of the Certification. If the renewal requirements are satisfied, the expiration of the Certification will be extended for 2 years. The date on which the extension takes effect becomes the Renewal Date for the Certification. Any renewal requirements completed before the Renewal Date of a Certification will not carry over to the new period.

Linux Foundation Certified System Administrator (LFCS) 

The Linux Foundation Certified System Administrator (LFCS) certification provides assurance that the recipient is knowledgeable in the use of Linux, especially in relation to the use of the terminal.

Linux Foundation Certified Engineer (LFCE) 

The Linux Foundation Certified Engineer (LFCE) certification provides assurance that the recipient is knowledgeable in the management and design of Linux systems.

Certified Kubernetes Security Specialist (CKS) 
In July 2020, The Linux Foundation announced a new Kubernetes certification, the Certified Kubernetes Security Specialist. Obtaining the CKS will require a performance-based certification exam.

See also
 Linux Professional Institute Certification
 Ubuntu Professional Certification

References

External links
 

Information technology qualifications